English–American musician, DJ, songwriter and record producer Mark Ronson has received various awards and nominations throughout his career. He is the recipient of seven Grammy Awards, two Brit Awards, two BMI Awards, two Soul Train Music Awards, a Critics Choice Award, a Golden Globe Award, a Guinness World Records, a MTV Video Music Award and an Academy Award. He has also been nominated for three Billboard Music Awards, a Daytime Emmy Award and four MOBO Awards.

Ronson came to prominence in 2006 as a music producer, best known for producing and writing songs on the albums Back to Basics by American singer Christina Aguilera and Back to Black by British singer Amy Winehouse. The latter album was acclaimed by music critics and Ronson was praised for his production. At the 50th Annual Grammy Awards, the album won him three awardsProducer of the Year, Non-Classical, Best Pop Vocal Album and its lead single "Rehab" won Record of the Year. The album went on to sell 12 million copies worldwide. Though his first studio album failed to make an impact, the release of his second album, Version in 2007 won him his first Brit Award for British Male Solo Artist.

In 2010, he released his third studio album, Record Collection. He was later nominated for Record of the Year at the 56th Annual Grammy Awards for producing American singer Bruno Mars' single "Locked Out of Heaven". Ronson's fourth studio album, Uptown Special (2015) produced his first Billboard Hot 100 number-one  single, "Uptown Funk" featuring Bruno Mars. The song earned Ronson the Brit Award for British Single of the Year and two Grammy AwardsRecord of the Year and Best Pop Duo/Group Performance. The album was also nominated for Best Pop Vocal Album.

In 2016, Ronson received further acclaim for producing American singer Lady Gaga's fifth studio album, Joanne. Ronson received his seventh Grammy nomination at the 59th Annual Grammy Awards in the category Best Compilation Soundtrack for Visual Media for producing the soundtrack to the documentary Amy. In 2018, Ronson formed the duo Silk City with fellow producer Diplo, producing the single "Electricity" featuring Dua Lipa. The single won him the Grammy Award for Best Dance Recording at the 61st Grammy Awards. That year, he also co-wrote the song "Shallow" for the film A Star is Born. The song won the Golden Globe Award for Best Original Song, the Critics' Choice Movie Award for Best Song and the Academy Award for Best Original Song and earned him two nominations at the 61st Annual Grammy AwardsSong of the Year and Best Song Written for Visual Media, winning the latter category.

Academy Awards
The Academy Awards, or Oscars, is an annual American awards ceremony honoring cinematic achievements in the film industry, and is organised by the Academy of Motion Picture Arts and Sciences (AMPAS).

!
|-
!2019
|"Shallow"
|Best Original Song
|
|
|-

American Music Awards
The American Music Awards, (AMA) is an annual music awards show, created by Dick Clark in 1973 for ABC when the network's contract to present the Grammy Awards expired. Unlike the Grammy's, which are awarded on the basis of votes by members of the Recording Academy, the AMAs are determined by a poll of the public and music buyers.

ARIA Music Awards
The ARIA Music Awards are presented annually by the Australian Recording Industry Association to recognize achievements in the Australian music industry.

!
|-
!scope="row"|2015
|Himself
|Best International Artist
|
|style="text-align:center;"|
|}

APRA Music Awards
The APRA Music Awards are presented by the Australasian Performing Right Association (APRA). The awards recognise achievements by ARPA's "outstanding songwriter, composer and publisher members in Popular Contemporary, Art Music and Screen Music". Nominations and winners are determined by the more than 60,000 eligible voting members of APRA, by members of its board, or by "APRA based statistical analysis".

BBC Music Awards
The BBC Music Awards are the BBC's inaugural pop music awards, first held in December 2014, as a celebration of the musical achievements over the past 12 months.

BET Awards
The BET Awards were established in 2001 by the Black Entertainment Television (BET) network to celebrate African Americans and other minorities in music, acting, sports, and other fields of entertainment.

!
|-
! scope="row" rowspan="2"|2015
|rowspan="2"|"Uptown Funk" 
|Best Collaboration
|
|rowspan="2" style="text-align:center;" |
|-
|Centric Award
|
|-
|}

Billboard Music Awards
The Billboard Music Awards honor artists for commercial performance in the U.S., based on record charts published by Billboard. The award ceremony was held from 1990 to 2007, until its reintroduction in 2011.

BMI Awards
Broadcast Music, Inc. (BMI) is one of three United States performing rights organizations, along with ASCAP and SESAC. It collects license fees on behalf of songwriters, composers, and music publishers and distributes them as royalties to those members whose works have been performed. 

! scope="col" |
|-
| align="center"|2015
| align="center"|"Uptown Funk" 
| align="center"|BMI Pop Song of the Year
|
| rowspan="2" align="center"|
|-
| 2018
| align="center"|Himself
| align="center"|BMI Champion Award
|

Brit Awards
The Brit Awards are British Phonographic Industry's annual pop music awards.

Critics' Choice Movie Awards 
The Critics' Choice Movie Awards have been presented annually since 1995 by the Broadcast Film Critics Association for outstanding achievements in the film industry.

!
|-
!scope="row"  | 2019
| "Shallow" 
| Best Song
| 
| rowspan=2 style="text-align:center;"|
|-
|}

Emmy Awards
The Emmy Awards, considered as a TV equivalent to the Academy Awards for film in US, are presented by the Academy of Television Arts & Sciences (ATAS), the National Academy of Television Arts & Sciences (NATAS) and the International Academy of Television Arts & Sciences in various sectors of the television industry including entertainment programming, news and documentary shows.

Daytime Emmy Awards
The Daytime Emmy Award is an American accolade bestowed by the New York City–based National Academy of Television Arts and Sciences in recognition of excellence in American daytime television programming. Emmys are considered the television equivalent to the Academy Awards (for film), Grammy Awards (for music) and Tony Awards (for theatre).

!
|-
! scope="row"|2016
|Mark Ronson and Bruno Mars in The Ellen DeGeneres Show
|Outstanding Musical Performance in a Talk Show/Morning Program
|
|style="text-align:center;" |
|}

Georgia Film Critics Association
Founded in 2011, The Georgia Film Critics Association (GAFCA) is an organization of professional film critics from Georgia. GAFCA members represent the reviewing press through online, radio, television or print media.

!
|-
!scope="row" |2019 
|"Shallow" 
|Best Original Song
|
|style="text-align:center;"|
|}

Golden Globe Awards
The Golden Globe Awards is an American accolade bestowed by the 93 members of the Hollywood Foreign Press Association (HFPA), which recognizes excellence in film and television, both domestic and foreign.

Grammy Awards
The Grammy Awards are awarded annually by the National Academy of Recording Arts and Sciences of the United States for outstanding achievements in the music industry. Often considered the highest music honor, the awards were established in 1958.

Guinness World records
The Guinness World Records is a reference book published annually, containing a collection of world records.

!
|-
!scope="row" rowspan="2"|2017
|"Uptown Funk" 
|Most weeks at No.1 on the U.S. Digital Song Sales
|
|align="center"|
|}

GQ Men of the Year Awards 
The annual GQ Men of the Year Awards recognize the most influential men in a variety of fields and are run by the men's fashion magazine GQ.

!
|-
!scope="row" |2016
|Himself
|Most Stylish Man of the Year
|
|style="text-align:center;"|
|}

Houston Film Critics Society
The Houston Film Critics Society is a non-profit film critic organization in Houston, Texas in the United States. The organization includes 25 film critics for print, radio, television, and internet publications in the greater Houston area.

!
|-
!scope="row" |2019
|"Shallow"
| Best Original Song
|
|style="text-align:center;"|
|}

iHeartRadio Music Awards
The iHeartRadio Music Awards is a music awards show, founded by iHeartRadio in 2014, to recognize the most popular artist and music of the past year as determined by the network's listener's.

Los Angeles Online Film Critics Society
Founded in 2016, the Los Angeles Online Film Critics Society (LAOFCS) is a film critic organization in Los Angeles, California.

!
|-
! scope="row"|2018
|"Shallow"
|Best Original Song
|
|style="text-align:center;"|
|}

LOS40 Music Awards
The LOS40 Music Awards, formerly known as Los Premios 40 Principales, is an annual Spanish award show by the musical radio station Los 40 Principales, that recognises the people and works of pop musicians. It was created in 2006 to celebrate the fortieth anniversary of the radio station's founding.

!
|-
|2015
|"Uptown Funk" 
|Best International Song
|
|style="text-align:center;" |
|-
| rowspan="2"| 2019
| Late Night Feelings
| Best International Album
| 
| style="text-align:center;" rowspan="2"|
|-
| "Nothing Breaks Like a Heart" 
| Best International Video
| 
|-
|}

MelOn Music Awards
The MelOn Music Awards is a major music award show that is held annually in South Korea and organized by LOEN Entertainment through its online music store, MelOn. It is known for only calculating digital sales and online votes to judge winners.

!
|-
! scope="row"|2015
| "Uptown Funk" 
|Best Pop
| 
|style="text-align:center;" |
|}

MOBO Awards
The Music of Black Origin Awards (MOBO) were established in 1995 by Kanya King MBE and Andy Ruffell. However they were first presented in 1996, are held annually in the United Kingdom to recognise artists of any race, ethnicity or nationality performing black music and "recognise the outstanding achievements of artists who perform music in genres ranging from Gospel, Jazz, RnB, Soul, Reggae to Hip Hop".

!
|-
! scope="row" rowspan="2"|2010
|rowspan="2"| Bang Bang Bang(featuring Q-Tip & MNDR)
| Best Video
| 
|style="text-align:center;" rowspan="2" |
|-
|rowspan="2"|Best Song
| 
|-
! scope="row" rowspan="2"|2015
|"Uptown Funk" 
|
|style="text-align:center;" rowspan="2"|
|-
|Mark Ronson
|Best Male Act
|
|}

MTV Awards

MTV Europe Music Awards
The MTV Europe Music Awards were established in 1994 by MTV Networks Europe to celebrate the most popular music videos in Europe.

!
|-
! scope="row" rowspan=2|2015
|rowspan=2|"Uptown Funk" 
|Best Song
|
|rowspan="2" style="text-align:center;" |
|-
|Best Collaboration
|
|}

MTV Millennial Awards
The MTV Millennial Awards is an annual program of Latin American music awards to honor the best of pop culture and the digital world of the millennial generation.

!
|-
! scope="row"|2015
| "Uptown Funk" 
|International Hit of the Year
| 
| style="text-align:center;"|
|}

MTV Video Music Award
The MTV Video Music Award were established in the end of the summer of 1984 by MTV to celebrate the top music videos of the year.

MTV Video Music Awards Japan
The MTV Video Music Awards Japan are the Japanese version of the MTV Video Music Awards. Initially Japan was part of the MTV Asia Awards, which were part all Asian countries, but because of the musical variety existent in Japan, a factor that neighboring countries have not, and in May 2002 began to hold their own awards independently.

!
|-
!scope="row"|2015
| "Uptown Funk"  (feat. Bruno Mars) 
| Best Male Video – International
| 
|style="text-align:center;" |
|-
|}

NME Awards
The NME Awards is an annual music awards show in the United Kingdom, founded by the music magazine, NME (New Musical Express). The first awards show was held in 1953 as the NME Poll Winners Concerts, shortly after the founding of the magazine.

!
|-
!scope="row"| 2015
|"Uptown Funk" 
|Dancefloor Filler
|
|style="text-align:center;"|
|}

Premios Juventud
Premios Juventud (Youthfulness Awards) is an awards show for Spanish–speaking celebrities in the areas of film, music, sports, fashion, and pop culture, presented by the television network Univision.

!
|-
!scope="row"|2015
|"Uptown Funk" 
|Favorite Hit
|
|style="text-align:center;" |
|}

RTHK International Pop Poll Awards
The RTHK International Pop Poll Awards is an annual award show presented at RTHK Studio 1 that honors the best in international and national music established in 1989.

!
|-
!scope="row" |2015
|"Uptown Funk" 
|Top 10 Gold International Gold Songs
|
|style="text-align:center;" |
|}

Soul Train Music Awards
The Soul Train Music Awards are produced by the makers of Soul Train to honor entertainers. It is an annual award show aired in national broadcast syndication that honors the best in African American music and entertainment established in 1987.

!
|-
!scope="row" rowspan="5"|2015
| rowspan="5"|"Uptown Funk"  (feat. Bruno Mars) 
| Song of the Year
| 
|rowspan="5" style="text-align:center;"|
|-
| Video of the Year 
| 
|-
| The Ashford & Simpson Songwriters Award
| 
|-
| Best Dance Performance
| 
|-
| Best Collaboration
| 
|}

Teen Choice Awards
The Teen Choice Awards is an annual awards show that airs on the Fox Network. The awards were established in 1999 to honor the year's biggest achievements in music, movies, sports, television and fashion as voted for by young people aged between 13 and 19.

!
|-
!scope="row" rowspan="3"|2015
| rowspan="3"|"Uptown Funk" 
| Choice Music Single: Male
| 
|rowspan="3" style="text-align:center;"|
|-
| Choice Music Party Song
| 
|-
| Choice Music: Collaboration
| 
|}

Telehit Awards
The Telehit Awards are annual award show run by the Mexican music channel Telehit that honors the top musical acts.

!
|-
!scope="row"|2015
|"Uptown Funk" 
|Song of the Year
|
|style="text-align:center;"|
|}

UK Music Video Awards
The UK Music Video Awards is an annual award ceremony founded in 2008 to recognise creativity, technical excellence and innovation in Music Videos and moving images for music.

!
|-
!scope="row"|2015
|"Uptown Funk" 
|rowspan=2|Best Pop Video - UK
|
|style="text-align:center;" |
|-
!scope="row" rowspan=2|2019
| "Nothing Breaks Like a Heart" 
| 
| style="text-align:center;" rowspan=2|
|-
| "Late Night Feelings" 
| Best Styling in a Video
| 
|}

Other awards
Glamour Women of the Year – Men of the Year – Winner 2008
Vodafone Live Music Awards – Best Live Male – Winner 2008

References

Ronson, Mark
Ronson, Mark